Li Ang may refer to:

Emperor Wenzong of Tang (809–840), personal name Li Ang, Tang dynasty emperor
Li Ang (writer) (born 1952), Taiwanese writer
Li Ang (footballer) (born 1993), Chinese association footballer
Li Ang (murderer), murdered Amanda Zhao

See also
Ang Li (disambiguation)
Ang Lee, Taiwanese-American film director
Liang (disambiguation)